The  occurred in Fukui Prefecture, Japan. The magnitude 6.8 quake struck at 5:13:31 p.m.(JDT) on June 28, 1948. The quake's hypocenter was approximately 10 km north-northeast of Fukui, in the present-day neighborhood of Maruoka, Sakai City. The strongest shaking occurred in the city of Fukui, where it was recorded as 6 (equivalent to the current 7) on the Japan Meteorological Agency seismic intensity scale.

Overview 
The earthquake devastated Fukui, which was still recovering from damage sustained during WWII air raids in July 1945. Damage across the entire Fukuiheiya flood plain into neighboring Ishikawa prefecture. Official casualty estimates totaled 3,769 dead and 22,000 wounded, with more than 36,000 buildings completely destroyed. In the Kanazugocho district (modern-day eastern Arawa); Maruoka and Harue; and Yoshida District, nearly every building was leveled. In central Fukui city, which was adjacent to the epicenter, approximately 79% of structures were completely destroyed, while the overall destruction rate across the Fukuiheiya floodplain surpassed 60%. Fires caused by the earthquake compounded the destruction. 

The quake also seriously damaged the embankments of the Kuzuryū River. Record-setting rain in the weeks following the quake subsequently caused the levees to burst, leading to massive flooding. 

Although three years of war damage, earthquake damage, fire damage, and flood damage reduced the city to ashes, it continued to rebuild. In honor of the citizens' resilience, the Fukui citizen's charter proclaims Fukui "City of the Phoenix."

Geology 

This earthquake was caused by a previously unknown strike-slip fault. Shaking was felt as far as Mito in the east, and Saga in the west.

Damage 
Damage was most reported in the Fukui plain, where the building collapse rate was more than 60%, since shaking became larger due to it being an alluvial plain, and many of the buildings were just built after the war and a little unstable.

At many people were cooking when the earthquake struck, many fires spread after the quake. Since the roads and the waterworks were damaged it took five days to put out the fires and so the fires caused devastating damage.

Even though the Daiwa Department Store collapsed, the Fukui Bank building right next to it had no significant damage. It is thought to have been because the Fukui Bank building had about 500 deep foundation pipes 10 meters deep in the ground.

Almost all of the farmers' houses in the epicenter area collapsed, but most of the farmers were outside so there were not many casualties.

Damage in Fukui City

Casualties 
At the time, it was the deadliest earthquake after the Pacific War (now superseded by the Great Hanshin earthquake and the Tōhoku earthquake and tsunami). This earthquake killed 3769 people, mainly in Sakai City (then part of Fukui City), where the death rate was more than 1%.

Property damage 
 Maruoka Castle collapsed.
 Hosorogi Station and Kanazu Station (now Awaraonsen Station) collapsed.
 The Daiwa Department Store collapsed.
 A theater in Fukui collapsed and caught fire, killing a few hundred people.

Other 
 Levees damaged by the earthquake and torrential rains caused Kuzuryū River to overflow.

Influence 
 The Japan Meteorological Agency added Shindo 7 to the Japan Meteorological Agency seismic intensity scale.

See also 

 List of earthquakes in 1948
 List of earthquakes in Japan

References

External links 
 Earthquake in Japan: June 1948 – slideshow by Life magazine
 

Fukui earthquake
Fukui earthquake
June 1948 events in Asia
Fukui
Earthquakes of the Showa period
History of Fukui Prefecture
Shindo 7 earthquakes
1948 disasters in Japan